Duch (Ghost) is a 2022 Czech action crime comedy television series by Prima televize. It is inspired by Randall and Hopkirk (Deceased).

Plot
The series tells the story of the inconspicuous criminalist Emil who works at the headquarters the Central Office against organized crime.  He is more of an analytical type of criminologist and isn't used to work in a field. The Central Office has been dealing with Darko Besarabič's crime group for a long time. Despite the fact that Emil does not excel in physical actions and his shooting tests are at the lower limit while his physical condition is similar, he is forced into action and gets injured in a shootout. He wakes up in a hospital and discovers that he has the ghost of Darko Besarabič by his side. Darko agrees to help Emil in his work if Emil helps him to find his killer.

Cast

Main
Štěpán Benoni as Emil Svoboda
Predrag Bjelac as Darko Besarabič
Marta Dancingerová as Radka
Pavel Batěk as Václav
Petr Batěk as Josef
Pavel Nečas as Chief Libor
Ha Thanh Špetlíková as Yjen

References

External links 
Official site
IMDB site
ČSFD site

Czech action television series
Czech crime television series
Czech comedy television series
2022 Czech television series debuts
Prima televize original programming